Cavo is an American hard rock band from St. Louis, Missouri.

Geography
Monte Cavo second highest mountain of the complex of the Alban Hills, near Rome, Italy
Cavo, village in Isle of Elba, Tuscany
:fr:Cavo, French spelling for Cavu river on Corsica

People
Andrés Cavo (1739-1803) Jesuit historian of New Spain
John de lo Cavo (Italian: Giovanni de lo Cavo)  Genoese pirate captain who entered the service of the Byzantine emperor Michael VIII

Acronyms
California Association of Voting Officials (CAVO)

See also
Cavos, an Italian family
Cavo-tricuspid isthmus body of fibrous tissue in the lower right atrium between the inferior vena cava, and the tricuspid valve.